Chartaq, chahartaq, chartaqi, or chahartaqi, literally meaning "having four arches", is an architectural unit consisted of four barrel vaults and a dome.

History
Chartaqi was a prominent element in Iranian architecture, having various functions and used in both secular and religious contexts for 1,500 years, with the first instance apparently being developed in the Sasanian city of Gor (Firuzabad) in 210s AD by King Ardashir I. The biggest instance of chahartaq is that of the so-called Palace of Shapur I at Bishapur, also in Pars. Many pre-Islamic chahartaqs have survived, but they are usually just the sole surviving structure of a much bigger complex. The chahartaq structure was adopted in Islamic architecture.

A related concept is čahārqāpū.

Contemporary architecture
The main plan of the post-modern Azadi Tower in Tehran is said to be influenced by the architecture of chartaqis.

See also

 Chartaque
 Chhatri
 Fire temple
 Iwan
 Pavilion
 Kiosk
 Tetrapylon
 Triumphal arch
 Ka'be-ye Zartosht

References

Domes
Architecture in Iran
Sasanian architecture
Islamic architectural elements
Arches and vaults
Iranian inventions